Lohgarh may refer to:
Lohgarh is a village in the district of Mohali in state of Punjab, India.
Lohgarh, Phillaur is a village in Phillaur tehsil of Jalandhar District of Punjab State, India. 
Lohgarh (Ludhiana West) is a village located in the Ludhiana West tehsil, of Ludhiana district, Punjab.
Lohgarh (Bilaspur) is a town in Bilaspur tehsil of Yamunanagar district of Haryana in India.